Left progressive may refers to:
Left-wing politics
Progressivism